Kosaku Sumiyoshi (1 October 1907 – 1971) was a Japanese track and field athlete. He represented his country twice at the Summer Olympics (1928 and 1932) and was the first Asian to compete in the Olympic javelin throw. He was a three-time gold medallist at the Far Eastern Championship Games and the only person to win two javelin titles at the competition.

Career
Born in Hiroshima, Japan, he first emerged as a javelin thrower at the 1927 Far Eastern Championship Games held in Shanghai.

This appearance made his Asia's first ever entrant into the Olympic javelin throw.

Sumiyoshi continued his regional dominance at the 1930 Far Eastern Championship Games in Tokyo. This made him the first and only person to win two javelin Far Eastern titles. He also won a second gold for the host nation, scoring 2838 in the athletics pentathlon to top rankings as part of a Japanese medal sweep of the event. He travelled to Vienna that year to compete against Western competitors and had a lifetime best throw of  – a feat which ranked him seventh globally that year.

In his last recorded season of athletic competition, he recorded  in September 1933 in São Paulo, placing twelfth globally.

International competitions

References

1907 births
1971 deaths
Japanese male javelin throwers
Japanese pentathletes
Olympic male pentathletes
Olympic athletes of Japan
Athletes (track and field) at the 1928 Summer Olympics
Athletes (track and field) at the 1932 Summer Olympics
Japan Championships in Athletics winners
20th-century Japanese people